Meredith Marakovits (born July 22, 1983) is the New York Yankees' clubhouse reporter for the YES Network, where she reports on the Yankees for the network’s Yankees game telecasts, pre-game and post-game shows, and the Yankees' Batting Practice Today show. Marakovits also appears on the network's special Yankees programming and contributes to the YESNetwork.com web site.

Early life

Marakovits was born in Walnutport, Pennsylvania in the Lehigh Valley. She attended Allentown Central Catholic High School in Allentown, Pennsylvania and earned a scholarship to play volleyball at the NCAA Division I level at La Salle University in Philadelphia. She graduated from La Salle in 2005.

Career
Marakovits began her career in Allentown, Pennsylvania with Service Electric, where she was the pre-game, post-game host and sideline reporter covering the Lehigh Valley IronPigs, the Triple-A affiliate of the Philadelphia Phillies. Marakovits also worked as a sideline reporter for Service Electric's college football, indoor football, and college basketball broadcasts. 

She later worked in the Philadelphia broadcast market with 97.5 The Fanatic, where she covered the Philadelphia Phillies, and with Comcast SportsNet Philadelphia, where she covered the Philadelphia 76ers until 2012. She also has worked in the New York City media market as an anchor and program contributor for SportsNet New York, as a contributor for WFAN "The Fan" radio, and as a fill-in anchor for NBC Sports Boston.

In 2012, Marakovits succeeded Kim Jones as the New York Yankees clubhouse reporter for the YES Network.
Meredith Marakovits worked as a Field level reporter for TBS MLB Tuesday starting in 2022.

References

External links

1983 births
Living people
Allentown Central Catholic High School alumni
Major League Baseball broadcasters
National Basketball Association broadcasters
College football announcers
College basketball announcers in the United States
American sports journalists
Sports commentators
La Salle University alumni
YES Network
People from Northampton County, Pennsylvania